Toamasina II is a district of Atsinanana in Madagascar. It covers the outskirts of the city of Toamasina and the surrounding rural communes.

Communes
The district is further divided into 15 communes:

 Ambodilazana
 Ambodiriana
 Amboditandroho
 Ampasibe Onibe
 Ampasimadinika
 Andondabe
 Andranobolaha
 Antenina
 Antetezambaro
 Fanandrana
 Mahavelona (Foulpointe)
 Ifito
 Mangabe
 Sahambala
 Toamasina suburbaine

References 

Districts of Atsinanana